Reset is the fifth studio album by Atari Teenage Riot, released on 26 March 2014 in Japan and on 9 February 2015 in the rest of the world.

Track listing

Critical reception

Upon the release the album scored 75 out of 100 on review aggregator site Metacritic, indication "generally positive reviews".

References

Atari Teenage Riot albums
2014 albums